Oskil Kupyansk was a Ukrainian football club from Kupyansk, Kharkivska oblast.

History

After winning the KFK 5th Zone (Eastern Ukraine) Amateur Championship in the 1992–93 season the club garnered the right to enter the Professional Leagues. The next season the club participated in the Ukrainian Third League. When the Ukrainian Third League was dissolved the club was promoted to the Ukrainian Second League Group B. Between 1995 and 2001 the club performed reasonably well, finishing in third place on three occasions.

In the 2001–02 the club fell on hard times financially and players left. The club was demoted to the amateur level but never recovered. The club ceased to exist in 2003.

Seasons

{|class="wikitable"
|-bgcolor="#efefef"
! Season
! Div.
! Pos.
! Pl.
! W
! D
! L
! GS
! GA
! P
!Domestic Cup
!colspan=2|Europe
!Notes
|-
|align=center|1993–94
|align=center|4th
|align=center|6
|align=center|34
|align=center|15
|align=center|6
|align=center|13
|align=center|52
|align=center|52
|align=center|36
|align=center|Did not enter
|align=center|
|align=center|
|align=center|
|-
|align=center|1994–95
|align=center|4th
|align=center|5
|align=center|42
|align=center|25
|align=center|5
|align=center|12
|align=center|50
|align=center|32
|align=center|80
|align=center|1/128 finals
|align=center|
|align=center|
|align=center bgcolor=green|Promoted
|-
|align=center|1995–96
|align=center|3rd "B"
|align=center|4
|align=center|38
|align=center|21
|align=center|7
|align=center|10
|align=center|45
|align=center|28
|align=center|70
|align=center|1/32 finals
|align=center|
|align=center|
|align=center|
|-
|align=center|1996–97
|align=center|3rd "B"
|align=center bgcolor=tan|3
|align=center|32
|align=center|15
|align=center|10
|align=center|7
|align=center|38
|align=center|23
|align=center|55
|align=center|1/16 finals
|align=center|
|align=center|
|align=center|
|-
|align=center|1997–98
|align=center|3rd "C"
|align=center|4
|align=center|30
|align=center|16
|align=center|5
|align=center|9
|align=center|35
|align=center|28
|align=center|53
|align=center|1/32 finals
|align=center|
|align=center|
|align=center|
|-
|align=center|1998–99
|align=center|3rd "C"
|align=center bgcolor=tan|3
|align=center|26
|align=center|14
|align=center|7
|align=center|5
|align=center|38
|align=center|20
|align=center|49
|align=center|1/128 finals
|align=center|
|align=center|
|align=center|
|-
|align=center|1999-00
|align=center|3rd "C"
|align=center|7
|align=center|26
|align=center|12
|align=center|6
|align=center|8
|align=center|29
|align=center|17
|align=center|42
|align=center|1/32 finals Second League Cup
|align=center|
|align=center|
|align=center|
|-
|align=center|2000–01
|align=center|3rd "C"
|align=center bgcolor=tan|3
|align=center|30
|align=center|16
|align=center|8
|align=center|6
|align=center|40
|align=center|24
|align=center|56
|align=center|1/16 finals Second League Cup
|align=center|
|align=center|
|align=center|
|-
|align=center|2001–02
|align=center|3rd "C"
|align=center|18
|align=center|34
|align=center|6
|align=center|7
|align=center|21
|align=center|28
|align=center|54
|align=center|25
|align=center|2nd Round
|align=center|
|align=center|
|align=center bgcolor=red|Relegated
|-
|align=center|2003
|align=center colspan=13|Club is dissolved
|}

Notes and references

External links
 Cemetery of Ukrainian football. Top 12 clubs that we lost (Цвинтар українського футболу. Топ-12 клубів, які ми втратили). Football 24. 28 March 2014

 
Defunct football clubs in Ukraine
Association football clubs established in 1993
Association football clubs disestablished in 2003
1993 establishments in Ukraine
2003 disestablishments in Ukraine
Football clubs in Kupyansk